Buddleja montana is a species endemic to the rocky hillsides of the cordilleras of Peru at altitudes of 2,700 – 4,000 m,  extending into Bolivia; it was named and described by Britton in 1898. The Latin specific epithet montana refers to mountains or coming from mountains.

Description
Buddleja montana is a dioecious shrub or small tree 2 – 8 m high, and is closely related to B. coriacea. The young branches are subquadrangular and tomentose, bearing coriaceous leaves oblong to elliptic 3 – 8 cm long by 0.5 – 1.5 cm wide, glabrescent above and thickly tomentose below, with 0.4 – 0.7 cm petioles. The deep yellow to orange inflorescence is paniculate with 1 – 2 orders of branches, 3 – 7 cm long by 2 – 6 cm wide, comprising small cymules; the corolla tubes 2.7 – 3.5 mm long.

Cultivation
The shrub is not known to be in cultivation.

References

montana
Flora of South America
Trees of Bolivia
Trees of Peru
Plants described in 1898
Dioecious plants